James Vandenberg (born November 24, 1989) is a former American football quarterback. He was signed as an undrafted free agent by the Minnesota Vikings in 2013. He played college football at Iowa.

High school career
Vandenberg went to Keokuk High School in Keokuk, Iowa. While in high school, Vandenberg was the most prolific passer in Iowa high school history. He ranks sixth all-time nationally in single season completion percentage, and tenth nationally in career completion percentage. He holds 10 different Iowa high school passing records, including career touchdown passes and single season touchdown passes.  In 2007, he led Keokuk to their first and only State Championship in football, winning the 3A title in a 42-7 blowout of Sioux City Heelan.

Vandenberg committed to the University of Iowa on December 7, 2007. Vandenberg also had scholarship offers from the University of Nebraska, Northern Illinois University, and University of Northern Iowa.

College career
After a year as a redshirt freshman, Vandenberg made his first career start for the Hawkeyes on November 14, 2009 against the Ohio State Buckeyes, stepping in for Ricky Stanzi who suffered a season-ending ankle injury the week before.  In his first game as a starter, Vandenberg faced off against Terrelle Pryor of the Buckeyes in a game that determined the Big Ten Conference title.  The Buckeyes won the game, 27–24, in overtime.  Vandenberg led the Hawkeyes through the end of the regular season. The Hawkeyes finished with an 11–2 record and a spot in the Orange Bowl against the Georgia Tech Yellow Jackets.

Passing statistics

Professional career
Vandenberg signed as an undrafted free agent for the Minnesota Vikings on April 27, 2013.  Vandenberg was released by the Vikings on August 26, 2013 (along with 12 others) to get to a 75-man roster.

References

External links
 Iowa profile

1989 births
Living people
American football quarterbacks
Iowa Hawkeyes football players